The third season of Junior Bake Off Brasil premiered on February 15, 2020 at 10:30 p.m. on SBT.

Bakers
The following is a list of contestants:

Results summary

Key
  Advanced
  Judges' favourite bakers
  Star Baker
  Eliminated
  Judges' bottom bakers
  Returned
  Runner-up
  Winner

Technical challenges ranking

Key
  Star Baker
  Eliminated

Ratings and reception

Brazilian ratings
All numbers are in points and provided by Kantar Ibope Media.

References

External links 

 Junior Bake Off Brasil on SBT

2020 Brazilian television seasons